

The Corby CJ-1 Starlet is a single seat, amateur-built aeroplane designed in the 1960s by Australian aeronautical engineer John Corby.

Design and development
The CJ-1 Starlet's structure is primarily wood and finished with fabric. A variety of engine types have been used, including  Volkswagen air-cooled engines, the  Rotax 912UL and the  Jabiru 2200.

The aircraft is built from plans, although some parts are available as well. Additionally Aircraft Spruce & Specialty offer materials kits for the design.

Variants
CJ-1
Base model, made from wood
CM-2
Model built from aluminium sheet, developed in New Zealand

Specifications (typical)

References

External links

 Corby Starlet

1960s Australian sport aircraft
Homebuilt aircraft
Low-wing aircraft
Single-engined tractor aircraft
Aircraft first flown in 1973